Maximalism (stylized in all caps) is the fourth studio album by the Swedish-Danish heavy metal band Amaranthe. It is also the final album to feature vocalist and co-founder Jake E. It was recorded between April 18 and August 3, 2016 and  released on October 21 the same year.

Track listing

Personnel

Amaranthe
Elize Ryd – clean vocals (female)
Jake E – clean vocals (male)
Olof Mörck – guitars, keyboards, programming, co-producer, mixing
Johan Andreassen – bass
Morten Løwe Sørensen – drums
Henrik Englund – harsh vocals

Production
Jacob Hansen – producer, engineer, mixing, mastering
Jakob Herrmann – co-producer, engineer

Miscellaneous
Mattias Bylund – strings on "Endlessly"
Michael Bohlin – mixing of Japanese bonus tracks
Gustavo Sazes – artwork
Patric Ullaeus – photography
Jonas Haagensen – studio assistant & co-engineering 
Christoffer Borg – studio assistant & co-engineering

Charts

References 

2016 albums
Amaranthe albums
Spinefarm Records albums
Albums produced by Jacob Hansen